Yarnell is an unincorporated community in Boggs Township, Centre County, Pennsylvania, United States.

Notes

Unincorporated communities in Centre County, Pennsylvania
Unincorporated communities in Pennsylvania